The East New Britain languages are a possible small language family spoken on the Gazelle Peninsula of New Britain in Papua New Guinea. They were classified as East Papuan languages by Wurm, but this does not now seem tenable. The only comparative work that has been done between the two branches of the proposed family is Ross (2001), which shows similarities in the pronouns.

Languages
The languages are:
Baining: Mali, Qaqet, Kairak, Simbali, Ura, ?Makolkol (extinct?)
Taulil–Butam: Taulil, Butam (extinct)
Makolkol is unattested. 

Glottolog does not accept that a connection between the two branches has been demonstrated. Stebbins et al. (2018) note that further work needs to be done, and are uncertain how to explain the similarity in pronouns between the two families with the fact that the ancestors of the Taulil and Butam people had migrated from New Ireland and so presumably would have their closest relatives there.

Pronouns
The pronouns Ross (2001) compares for East New Britain are as follows.

{| class=wikitable
! colspan=2| || 1sg || 2sg || 3msg || 3fsg || 1pl || 2pl || 3pl || 1du || 2du || 3du
|-
! colspan=2| proto-ENB
|*ŋ(u)a || *ŋi(a) || *a || *E ||  || *ŋan(i) || *ta || *Nun ||  || *i
|-
!rowspan=2| Baining
!free
| ŋua || ŋia || ka || ki || uut || ŋen || ta~ra || uun || uin || ian~iam
|-
!poss.
| gua || gia || aa || colspan=7| 
|-
!rowspan=3|Taulil
!free sbj
| ŋa || ŋi || aa || e || daa || yaa || taa || ŋu || yu || 
|-
!free obj
|ŋaaŋ||ŋiŋ||aa||e||undu||ŋan||taa||ŋun||yu||ip (3mdu), vitam (3fdu)
|-
!poss.
|ŋa||ŋi||vaa||ve||du||ina||ina~ta||ŋunu||yu||ip (3mdu), ito (3fdu)
|-
!rowspan=2|Butam
!free
|ŋa||ŋi||a||e||ur||ŋan||ta~ra||un||yu||ip
|-
!poss.
|ŋaŋ||ŋiŋ||vat||vet||(r)uru||ŋan||(i)ra||(n)un||...||ip
|}

See also
Baining people
Papuan languages

References

 Dunn, Michael; Angela Terrill; Ger Reesink; Robert A. Foley; Stephen C. Levinson (2005). Structural Phylogenetics and the Reconstruction of Ancient Language History. Science magazine, 23 Sept. 2005, vol. 309, p 2072.
 Ross, Malcolm (2005). Pronouns as a preliminary diagnostic for grouping Papuan languages." In: Andrew Pawley, Robert Attenborough, Robin Hide and Jack Golson, eds, Papuan pasts: cultural, linguistic and biological histories of Papuan-speaking peoples, 15-66. Canberra: Pacific Linguistics.

External links
East New Britain languages database at TransNewGuinea.org

 
Language families
East Papuan languages
Languages of East New Britain Province